The 2014 European Tour was the sixth edition of the Race to Dubai and the 43rd season of golf tournaments since the European Tour officially began in 1972. The schedule comprised 49 tournaments counting for the Race to Dubai, including the four major championships and four World Golf Championships, and concluded with four Final Series events culminating at the DP World Tour Championship, Dubai at the end of November.

Northern Ireland's Rory McIlroy won the Race to Dubai for the second time, having won two majors, a WGC and the European Tour's flagship event, the BMW PGA Championship, during the season. He was also named Golfer of the Year. Brooks Koepka of the United States was the Sir Henry Cotton Rookie of the Year.

Miguel Ángel Jiménez twice broke his own record as the oldest winner in the history of the European Tour as he defended the Hong Kong Open title in December and won the Open de España the following May. With victory in his national open, he also became the tour's only winner over the age of 50.

Changes for 2014
New tournaments for the 2014 season were the Made in Denmark, D+D Real Czech Masters tournaments and the EurAsia Cup team event between the Europe Tour and the Asian Tour. Lost from the schedule were the Avantha Masters and the Johnnie Walker Championship at Gleneagles, with the venue hosting the 2014 Ryder Cup. In addition, the Ballantine's Championship moved from South Korea to Singapore and was renamed as The Championship at Laguna National. A third new tournament, the NH Collection Open, a dual-ranking event with the second-tier Challenge Tour, was later added to the schedule.

Schedule
The following table lists official events during the 2014 season.

Unofficial events
The following events were sanctioned by the European Tour, but did not carry official money, nor were wins official.

Location of tournaments

Race to Dubai
Since 2009, the European Tour's money list has been known as the "Race to Dubai". It is based on money earned during the season and is calculated in euro, with earnings from tournaments that award prize money in other currencies being converted at the exchange rate available the week of the event.

Final standings
Final top 15 players in the Race to Dubai:

• Did not play

Awards

Golfer of the Month

See also
2013 in golf
2014 in golf
2014 Challenge Tour
2014 European Senior Tour
2014 PGA Tour

Notes

References

External links
2014 season results on the PGA European Tour website
2014 Order of Merit on the PGA European Tour website

European Tour seasons
European Tour